Elysius disciplaga is a moth of the family Erebidae. It was described by Francis Walker in 1856. It is found in Mexico, Guatemala, Panama, Colombia, Bolivia.

References

disciplaga
Moths described in 1856
Moths of North America
Moths of South America